Jake R. Jewell (born May 16, 1993) is an American professional baseball pitcher in the Philadelphia Phillies organization. He has pitched in MLB for the Los Angeles Angels and Chicago Cubs. The Angels selected Jewell in the fifth round of the 2014 MLB draft. He made his MLB debut in 2018.

Early life
Jewell was born in Norman, Oklahoma. He attended Norman High School and Northeastern Oklahoma A&M College.

Career

Los Angeles Angels
The Angels selected Jewell in the fifth round of the 2014 MLB draft. He signed and spent 2015 with both the Arizona League Angels and the Orem Owlz, posting a 1–2 win-loss record and 3.59 earned run average (ERA) in 12 games (nine starts) over  innings between the two teams. 

In 2015, he played for the Burlington Bees in the Class A Midwest League where he compiled a 6–8 record and 4.77 ERA in  innings pitched. Baseball America named him the Angels No. 5 prospect entering 2016 season. In 2016, he played for the Inland Empire 66ers of the Class A-Advanced California League, pitching to a 2–15 record, 6.31 ERA, and 1.87 walks plus hits per inning pitched (WHIP) ratio in 28 games (27 starts) over 137 innings.

Jewell began 2017 back with the 66ers, and after posting a 2.25 ERA in his first three starts, was promoted to the Mobile BayBears of the Class AA Southern League, where he finished the season, going 7–8 with a 4.84 ERA in 24 games (23 starts). After the 2017 season, the Angels added Jewell to their 40-man roster. He began the 2018 season with the BayBears, and after seven games, was promoted to the Salt Lake Bees of the Class AAA Pacific Coast League, with whom he was 2–4 with a 3.60 ERA in 25 innings. 

The Angels promoted Jewell to the major leagues on June 15. He made his major league debut the next day against the Oakland Athletics at Oakland Coliseum, pitching a scoreless eighth inning in which he earned his first major league strikeout against Franklin Barreto. During Jewell's third MLB game, on June 27 against the Boston Red Sox, he left the game after an apparent ankle injury suffered while trying to make a play at the plate. The following day, the Angels placed Jewell on the disabled list due to a right fibula fracture, requiring season-ending surgery. For the season with the Angels, he pitched 2 innings and was 0–1.

In 2019 with Salt Lake, Jewell was 4–4 with eight saves and a 5.26 ERA in  innings, and with the Angels he was 0–0 with a 6.84 ERA in  innings. Jewell was designated for assignment on January 6, 2020, following the acquisition of Kyle Keller. He was claimed off waivers by the San Francisco Giants on January 13. Jewell was designated for assignment by the Giants on January 21, and outrighted on January 24. He became a free agent on November 2, 2020.

Chicago Cubs
On November 16, 2020, Jewell signed a minor league deal with the Chicago Cubs. He was called up on July 29, 2021.
Jewell made 10 appearances for the Cubs, struggling to a 9.90 ERA with 10 strikeouts. On August 28, 2021, Jewell was designated for assignment by the Cubs.

Los Angeles Dodgers
On August 31, 2021, Jewell was claimed off waivers by the Los Angeles Dodgers. Jewell did not appear in a game for the Dodgers and made 2 appearances for the Triple-A Oklahoma City Dodgers, tossing  scoreless innings.

San Francisco Giants
On September 7, 2021, Jewell was claimed off waivers by the San Francisco Giants. On September 11, the Giants outrighted Jewell off the 40-man roster and assigned him to the Triple-A Sacramento River Cats. On October 20, Jewell elected free agency.

Cleveland Guardians
On March 17, 2022, Jewell signed a minor league contract with the Cleveland Guardians. The deal included an invitation to the Guardians' 2022 major league spring training camp. Jewell began the 2022 season with the Columbus Clippers, the Guardians' Triple-A affiliate. The Guardians selected Jewell's contract on August 6. He was designated for assignment on August 15, without having made an appearance for the Guardians.

Minnesota Twins
On August 17, 2022, Jewell was claimed off waivers by the Minnesota Twins. On September 6, Jewell was designated for assignment. On October 13, Jewell elected free agency.

Philadelphia Phillies
On January 3, 2023, Jewell signed a minor league deal with the Philadelphia Phillies.

References

External links

Living people
1993 births
Sportspeople from Norman, Oklahoma
Baseball players from Oklahoma
Major League Baseball pitchers
Los Angeles Angels players
Chicago Cubs players
Northeastern Oklahoma A&M Golden Norsemen baseball players
Arizona League Angels players
Orem Owlz players
Burlington Bees players
Inland Empire 66ers of San Bernardino players
Mobile BayBears players
Salt Lake Bees players
Iowa Cubs players
Oklahoma City Dodgers players